Shopmobility Lochaber is a Scottish Charitable Incorporated Organisation (SCIO). It is based in Fort William in Inverness-shire, a few miles from the foot of Ben Nevis.

The charity's aim is "To improve the lifestyle, freedom, independence and social inclusion of its clients, who have either a temporary or permanent mobility problem, by providing a top class FREE hire service of wheelchairs, rollators, powerchairs and electric ride-on scooters. They also sell equipment occasionally, to make way for new equipment and have a few daily living aids for sale. Their office is situated behind the railway station in Fort William and is run by one full-time and one part-time member of staff, supported by a group of volunteers, who are also Trustees of the charity.

References

Charities based in Scotland
Fort William, Highland
Organisations based in Highland (council area)
Disability organisations based in Scotland